Catherine Nakalembe is an Ugandan remote sensing scientist and an associate research professor at the University of Maryland (UMD) in the Department of Geographical Sciences and the NASA Harvest Africa program Director. Her research includes drought, agriculture and food security.

In 2020, Nakalembe was awarded the Africa Food Prize.

Early life and education 
Nakalembe grew up in Kampala, Uganda. Her father is a self-taught car mechanic, and her mother owns and operates a restaurant in Makindye.

Nakalembe entered the environmental science field by chance, as she missed her first preference sports science course when she was enrolling for her undergraduate program at Makerere University early in 2002. In 2007, she received her undergraduate degree in Environmental Sciences from Makerere University.

After undergraduate studies, she received a partial scholarship for the master’s program in geography and environmental engineering at the Johns Hopkins University. She received her Master's degree in 2009.

Nakalembe received her Ph.D in Geographical Science at the University of Maryland under the supervision of Chris Justice. Her doctoral research aimed to highlight the consequences of drought on land use and on the lives of North Eastern Ugandans. It  was the first step in forming the basis of the remote sensing element of the disaster risk financing project which has supported over 75,000 households in the region since initial scaleup in 2017 and saving the Uganda government resources that would otherwise go towards emergency assistance.

Work 
She is the Africa Program Director in the NASA Harvest Program and is known for her work using remote sensing and machine learning technology supporting the development of agriculture and  food security across Africa. She pioneered the remote sensing by unmanned aerial vehicles in surveying refugee settlements and landslide mapping in Uganda. She has conducted research in remote sensing of drought, agriculture, and leading the integration of earth observations in agricultural monitoring of small holder agriculture in multiple countries.

Nakalembe organizes and leads training on remote sensing tools and data, works with national ministries on their agricultural decision-making processes, and heads initiatives to prevent potentially disastrous impacts of crop failure.

Honors and awards 
She received the Group on Earth Observations first Individual Excellence Award in 2019.

In 2020, she shared the Africa Food Prize (AFP) with Dr. André Bationo from Burkina Faso. Olusegun Obasanjo, Chair of the AFP Committee, stated "We need innovative Africans like Dr. Bationo and Dr. Nakalembe to demonstrate the potential of new knowledge and technology together with practical technologies that help improve the value proposition for farmers. These two are indeed exceptional Africans."

She was a 2020 UMD Research Excellence Honoree. In 2022, she received the Ugandan Golden Jubilee medal (civilian). It was presented to her parents by president Yoweri Museveni.

Personal life 
Nakalembe is married to Sebastian Deffner, an associate professor of Theoretical Physics at the University of Maryland, Baltimore County (UMBC).
They have two children.

References

External links
Catherine Nakalembe at NASA Harvest

Interview at Project Geospatial, 13 Mars 2020
Profile on BBC News, 27 Dec 2020

Living people
Makerere University alumni
Johns Hopkins University alumni
Ugandan women scientists
University of Maryland, College Park people
NASA people
People from Kampala
Year of birth missing (living people)
Environmental scientists